The 2014 Second Division Football tournament was the 7th edition of the Second Division Football Tournament. The winners were TC Sports Club, which were awarded promotion to the 2015 Dhivehi Premier League after claiming second position in the 2015 Dhivehi League play-off.

Final

Awards

Controversies
On 29 March 2015, Football Association of Maldives (FAM) finalized a disciplinary action against VB Addu, regarding the incident occurred during their match against TC Sports Club in September 2014. VB Addu refused to play the match after their player, Ismail Shahud Ali was sent-off in the 49th minute for using foul language on referee. After inspecting the report of match commissioner and match officials, the FAM disciplinary committee ended up deciding that VB Addu lost the match 3–0 under 26th bullet of FAM disciplinary code. Moreover, 1 point was deducted from them, with reference to the 26th bullet of FAM disciplinary code and 2nd and 12th point of FIFA disciplinary code's bullet 56. VB Addu FC was also fined by MVR 5000, while Ismail Shahud Ali was fined by MVR 1000 and banned for 4 matches.

With this deduction of a point, VB Addu dropped places to the bottom of the 2014 Second Division Football Tournament standings and got relegated to the 2015 Third Division Football Tournament, while the least positioned Vyansa automatically moved up and retained at the Second Division Football Tournament for the 2015 season.

References

Maldivian Second Division Football Tournament seasons
Maldives
Maldives
2